Eber F. Piers (June 2, 1889 - December 20, 1961) was an American architect. Between 1911 and 1952, he designed more than 300 buildings in or around Ogden, Utah, including the NRHP-listed El Monte Golf Course Clubhouse in 1934–1935.

References

1889 births
1961 deaths
People from Ogden, Utah
Architects from Utah
20th-century American architects